The Coalition Vakat (sometimes translated as the Vakat Coalition) is a Bosniak political coalition in Kosovo founded in June 2004 made up of the Democratic Party of Bosniaks (DSB), Democratic Party Vatan (DSV), and the Bosniac Party of Kosovo (BSK). The coalition uses the colors green, yellow, and sky blue. Its headquarters is located in Prizren.

Electoral performance

See also
Party of Democratic Action (Kosovo)

Notes

External links
assembly-kosova.org 

Bosniak political parties
Political parties of minorities in Kosovo
Political party alliances in Kosovo